In Aztec religion,  ("Painted with Bells") is a daughter of the priestess  ("Serpent Skirt"). She led her brothers in an attack against their mother, when they learned she was pregnant, convinced she dishonored them all. The attack is thwarted by 's other brother, Huitzilopochtli, the national deity of the Mexicas.

In 1978, workers at an electric company accidentally discovered a large stone relief depicting  in Mexico City. The discovery of the  stone led to a large-scale excavation, directed by Eduardo Matos Moctezuma, to unearth the Huēyi Teōcalli (Templo Mayor in Spanish). The prominent position of the  stone suggests the importance of her defeat by Huitzilopochtli in Aztec religion and national identity.

Birth of Huitzilopochtli and Coyolxauqui's defeat at Coatepec 

On the summit of Coatepec ("Serpent Mountain"), sat a shrine for Coatlicue, the maternal Earth deity. One day, as she swept her shrine, a ball of hummingbird feathers fell from the sky. She "snatched them up; she placed them at her waist." Thus, she became pregnant with the Aztec deity Huitzilopochtli.

Her miraculous pregnancy embarrassed Coatlicue's other children, including her eldest daughter, Coyolxauhqui. Hearing of her pregnancy, the Centzon Huitznahuas, led by Coyolxauhqui, decided to kill Coatlicue. As they prepared for battle and gathered at the base of Coatepec, one of the Centzon Huitznahuas, Quauitlicac, warned Huitzilopochtli of the attack while he was in utero. Hearing of the attack, the pregnant  miraculously gave birth to a fully grown and armed Huitzilopochtli who sprang from her womb, wielding "his shield, teueuelli, and his darts and his blue dart thrower, called xinatlatl."

Huitzilopochtli killed , beheading her and throwing her body down the side of Coatepec: "He pierced Coyolxauhqui, and then quickly struck off her head. It stopped there at the edge of Coatepetl. And her body came falling below; it fell breaking to pieces; in various places her arms, her legs, her body each fell." As for his brothers, the Centzon Huitxnahuas, he scattered them in all directions from the top of Coatepec. He pursued them relentlessly, and those who escaped went south.

Some authors have written that Huitzilopochtli tossed Coyolxauhqui's head into the sky where it became the Moon, so that his mother would be comforted in seeing her daughter in the sky every night, and that her scattered brothers became the Southern Star deities. It is difficult to verify these variations of the narrative with 16th century sources.

Templo Mayor stone disk

Discovery 

On February 21, 1978, a group of workers for the Mexico City electric-power company came across a large shield-shaped stone covered in reliefs while digging. The stone they uncovered depicts the narrative of Coyolxauhqui's defeat at Coatepec, shown at left. The discovery renewed the interest in excavating the ancient city of Tenochtitlan, underneath Mexico City. This led to the excavation of the Huēyi Teōcalli (Templo Mayor), directed by Eduardo Matos Moctezuma. 

This relief is one of the best known Aztec monuments and one of the few great Aztec monuments to have been found fully in situ.

Location 
The Coyolxauhqui stone sat at the base of the stairs of the Huēyi Teōcalli, the primary temple of the Mexica in Tenochtitlan, on the side dedicated to Huitzilopochtli. The stone laid in the center of a platform that extended from the foot of the stairway. The temple is dedicated to Huitzilopochtli and Tlaloc, the Aztec rain deity. Scholars believe that Mexica artists and builders incorporated images of the Coatepec narrative into the Huēyi Teōcalli during a major renovation from the years 4 Reed to 8 Reed (1483-1487) under the rule of Ahuitzotl.

Eduardo Matos Moctezuma first noted that the placement of the monument at the bottom of the Templo Mayor commemorated the history of Huitzilopochtli defeating Coyolxauhqui in the battle on Mount Coatepetel. Matos Moctezuma has argued that the section of the Huēyi Teōcalli dedicated to Huitzilopochtli represents the sacred mountain of Coatepec where Huitzilopochtli was born and Coyolxauhqui died.

The Coyolxauhqui stone was located in what was named Phase IV of the Templo Mayor during its excavation.

Creation 

The artist of the Coyolxauhqui stone carved this disk in high relief out of a single large stone, 3.25 meters in diameter. Aztec historian Richard Townsend describes it as one of the most powerfully expressive sculptures of Mesoamerican art,  using "an assurance of design and a technical virtuosity not previously seen at the pyramids."

The stone was likely created under the rule of Axayacatl (1469-1481).

Imagery 
On the disk, Coyolxauhqui lies on her back, with her head, arms and legs severed from her body. Her head faces upwards, away from her torso and in profile view, with her mouth open. Her dismembered torso lies flat on her back. Her breasts sag downward. Her body is neatly yet dynamically organized within the circular composition. Scallop-shaped carving line the points of decapitation and dismemberment at her neck, shoulders, and hip joints. In this representation, Coyolxauhqui is nearly naked, barring her serpent loincloth. She wears only the ritual attire of bells in her hair, a bell symbol on her cheek, and a feathered headdress. These objects identify her as Coyolxauhqui. She wears a skull tied to a belt of snakes around her waist and an ear tab showing the Mexica year sign. Snake, skull, and earth monster imagery surround her.

In the image to the right, which represents the original colors of the stone, Coyolxauhqui's yellow body lies before a red background. Bright blue colors her headdress and various details in the carving. White bones emerge from the scalloped dismembered body parts.

Uses 
The Coyolxauhqui stone would have served as a cautionary sign to the enemies of Tenochtitlan. According to Aztec history, female deities such as Coyolxauhqui were the first Aztec enemies to die in war. In this, Coyolxauhqui came to represent all conquered enemies. Her violent death was a warning for the fate of the those who crossed the Mexica people. Richard Townsend notes that the disk represented the defeat of the Aztecs' enemies at large. 

Sacrificial victims crossed this stone before walking up the stairs of the temple to the block in front of Huitzilopochtli's shrine.

Role in sacrifice 
Scholars also believe that the decapitation and destruction of Coyolxauhqui is reflected in the pattern of warrior ritual sacrifice, particularly during the feast of Panquetzaliztli (Banner Raising). The feast takes place in the 15th month of the Aztec calendar and is dedicated to Huitzilopochtli. During the ceremony, captives’ hearts were cut out and their bodies were thrown down the temple stairs to the Coyolxauhqui stone. There, they were decapitated and dismembered, just as Coyolxauhqui was by Huitzilopochtli on Coatepec.

See also 
 Aztec sun stone
 Stone of Motecuhzoma I
 Stone of Tizoc
Templo Mayor
Huitzilopochtli
Coatepec
Panquetzaliztli
Centzon Huitnahuas
Coyolxauhqui imperative, a theory named after the goddess

References

External links 
In-depth interactive exploring Coyolxauhqui and her story by the J. Paul Getty Museum. Features the Head of Coyolxauhqui, found near the Templo Mayor, Mexico City. Museo Nacional de Antropología

Aztec goddesses
Lunar goddesses
Magic goddesses